Chilenchus is a genus of nematodes in the family Tylenchidae. The name comes from Chile, the country from where it originates.

The genus contains one species, Chilenchus elegans (Raski & Geraert, 1986) (syn. Lelenchus elegans Raski & Geraert, 1986). the type species was collected from moist soil under thick tundra at Orange Bay, Hardy Peninsula, Hoste Island, Chile.

References

External links 

 Chilenchus at Biolib.cz
 Chilenchus elegans at Biolib.cz

Tylenchida
Secernentea genera
Monotypic protostome genera